Ice Cream is a Bangladeshi coming-of-age romantic drama film written and directed by Redoan Rony and produced by Shukla Banik under the banner of Ping Pong Entertainment. It features Sariful Razz, Kumar Uday, Nazifa Tushi while ATM Shamsuzzaman, Omar Sani, Parveen Sultana Diti and Sayem Sadat in supporting roles.

The film is scheduled for released on 29 April 2016. Minar Rahman made his playback career debut with this film.

Cast
 Sariful Razz
 Nazifa Tushi
 Kumar Uday
 ATM Shamsuzzaman
 Omar Sani
 Parveen Sultana Diti
 Sayem Sadat
 Salha Khanam

References

2016 films
2016 romantic drama films
Bengali-language Bangladeshi films
Bangladeshi romantic drama films
Films scored by Fuad
Films scored by Pavel Arin
Films scored by Sajid Sarkar
2010s Bengali-language films